Marco Rente (born 25 February 1997) is a German professional footballer who plays as a centre-back for Heracles Almelo.

Club career
Rente made his professional debut for Heracles Almelo in the Eredivisie on 27 September 2020, starting in the home match against PSV Eindhoven.

References

External links
 
 
 
 
 Sportfreunde Siegen II statistics at Fussball.de
 Career stats & Profile - Voetbal International

1997 births
Living people
Sportspeople from Siegen
Footballers from North Rhine-Westphalia
German footballers
Association football central defenders
Sportfreunde Siegen players
TuS Erndtebrück players
Borussia Dortmund II players
Heracles Almelo players
Regionalliga players
Eredivisie players
German expatriate footballers
German expatriate sportspeople in the Netherlands
Expatriate footballers in the Netherlands